Madagascar sent a delegation that competed at the 2020 Summer Olympics in Tokyo. The games were originally scheduled to take place from 24 July to 9 August 2020, but were postponed to 23 July to 8 August 2021, due to the COVID-19 pandemic. It was the nation's thirteenth appearance at the Olympics, since its debut in 1964.

Six athletes from Madagascar were selected for the Games, competing in four different sports. Damiella Nomenjanahary and Éric Andriantsitohaina were chosen to be Madagascar's flag bearers during the Parade of Nations of the opening ceremony. There were no Malagasy athletes at the closing ceremony.

Competitors
The following is the list of number of competitors in the Games.

Athletics

Madagascar received a universality slot from the World Athletics to send a male track and field athlete to the Olympics.

Todisoa Rabearison finished eighth in his heat for the Men's 400 metres with a time of 48.40, his season's best, but 1.6 seconds slower than his personal best, and did not advance.

Track & road events

Judo
 
Madagascar qualified one judoka for the women's half-middleweight category (63 kg) at the Games. Damiella Nomenjanahary accepted a continental berth from Africa as the nation's top-ranked judoka outside of direct qualifying position in the IJF World Ranking List of June 28, 2021.

Swimming

Madagascar received a universality invitation from FINA to send two top-ranked swimmers (one per gender) in their respective individual events to the Olympics, based on the FINA Points System of June 28, 2021.

Weightlifting

Madagascar entered two weightlifters into the Olympic competition. Brothers Éric Andriantsitohaina (men's 61 kg) and Tojonirina Andriantsitohaina (men's 67 kg) both topped the field of weightlifters from the African zone in their respective weight divisions based on the IWF Absolute Continental Rankings.

At the Olympics, Tojonirina Andriantsitohaina finished eleventh in the 67kg competition, lifting 130 kg in the snatch and 155 kg in the clean and jerk for a total weight of 285kg. Éric Andriantsitohaina lifted 114 kg in the snatch and 150 kg in the clean and jerk for a total weight of 264 kg, finishing in the same placement as his teammate Andriantsitohaina during the men's 61-kg division.

References

Nations at the 2020 Summer Olympics
2020